Changa is a town in the Islamabad Capital Territory of Pakistan. It is located at 33° 19' 20N 73° 22' 55E with an altitude of 495 metres (1627 feet).

References 

Union councils of Islamabad Capital Territory